The 1934 Columbia Irish football team was an American football team that represented Columbia University (later renamed the University of Portland) as an independent during the 1934 college football season. In its eighth year under head coach Gene Murphy, the team compiled a 1–6–1 record. The team played its home games at Multnomah Stadium in Portland, Oregon. The school changed its name in 1935, and the football team became known as the "Portland Pilots".

Schedule

References

Columbia
Portland Pilots football seasons
Columbia Irish football
Columbia Irish football